Parada National High School is a public school located at S. de Guzman St., Parada, Valenzuela City in the Philippines. It currently has two separate buildings (separated by a road), informally known as the old and new buildings.

References

High schools in Metro Manila
Schools in Valenzuela, Metro Manila
Educational institutions established in 1968
Public schools in Metro Manila
1968 establishments in the Philippines